The 2019 M*League Division 1, played between top-level football club in the Northern Mariana Islands, consists of two tournaments: the Spring League and the Fall League.

Teams
A total of seven teams competed in the league. MP United, which won the 2018 Spring League, did not compete, and were replaced by Teen Ayuyu, which are the national U-18 team. The 2018 Fall League was abandoned due to the damages caused by Typhoon Yutu.

Kanoa
KFAS
Matansa
Paire
Tan Holdings
Teen Ayuyu (NMI U-18)
The Old B Bank

Spring League

Regular season

Playoffs

Fall League

References

Marianas Soccer League seasons
Northern Mariana Islands
1